The Westminster Arms is a public house in the City of Westminster, London, England.

It is one of six local pubs containing a division bell, used to alert members of parliament that a vote will soon be taken in Parliament.

The main lounge is on the ground floor, while the 40-seat Queen Anne dining room is on the first floor. A wine bar, Storey's, is in the basement level.

Before the Queen Elizabeth II Centre was built, the pub had a clear view of Elizabeth Tower, which contains Big Ben.

Notable past patrons include Desmond Tutu, Bill Clinton and Angelina Jolie.

Gallery

References

External links

Pubs in the City of Westminster
Buildings and structures in the City of Westminster
1913 establishments in England